The Philadelphia Phillies are a Major League Baseball team based in Philadelphia, Pennsylvania. They  are a member of the Eastern Division of Major League Baseball's National League. The team has played officially under two names since beginning play in 1883: the current moniker, as well as the "Quakers", which was used in conjunction with "Phillies" during the team's early history. The team was also known unofficially as the "Blue Jays" during the World War II era. Since the franchise's inception,  players have made an appearance in a competitive game for the team, whether as an offensive player (batting and baserunning) or a defensive player (fielding, pitching, or both).

Of those  Phillies, 68 have had surnames beginning with the letter K. Two of those players have been inducted into the Baseball Hall of Fame: pitcher Tim Keefe, who holds the record for the lowest single-season earned run average (ERA) in major league history; and right fielder Chuck Klein, who played 15 seasons for Philadelphia in three separate stints. The Phillies are listed by the Hall of Fame as Klein's primary team. He is one of two members of this list to be elected to the Philadelphia Baseball Wall of Fame—the other being John Kruk— and holds two franchise records (career slugging percentage – .553; career on-base plus slugging – .935). Klein is the only player on this list for whom the Phillies have retired a number; since he began play with Philadelphia before uniform numbers were widely in use and wore a variety of numbers throughout his Phillies career, he is represented by the letter "P" rather than a specific number.

Among the 32 batters in this list, Klein has the highest batting average, at .326; other players with an average over .300 include Bill Keister (.320 in one season), Ed Konetchy (.321 in one season), and Kruk (.309 in six seasons). Klein also leads all players on this list with 243 home runs and 983 runs batted in.

Of this list's 36 pitchers, two—Jack Kucek and Bob Kuzava—have undefeated win–loss records; each has won one game and lost none. Jim Konstanty, the closer for the Whiz Kids, has 51 victories and 39 defeats, most among this list's pitchers; Keefe's 226 strikeouts lead in that category. Johnny Klippstein compiled this list's lowest earned run average, with a 2.28 average in two seasons with Philadelphia.

Footnotes
Key
 The National Baseball Hall of Fame and Museum determines which cap a player wears on their plaque, signifying "the team with which he made his most indelible mark". The Hall of Fame considers the player's wishes in making their decision, but the Hall makes the final decision as "it is important that the logo be emblematic of the historical accomplishments of that player's career".
 Players are listed at a position if they appeared in 30% of their games or more during their Phillies career, as defined by Baseball-Reference.com. Additional positions may be shown on the Baseball-Reference website by following each player's citation.
 Franchise batting and pitching leaders are drawn from Baseball-Reference.com. A total of 1,500 plate appearances are needed to qualify for batting records, and 500 innings pitched or 50 decisions are required to qualify for pitching records.
 Statistics are correct as of the end of the 2010 Major League Baseball season.

References
General

Inline citations

K